The district of Graudenz was a Prussian district in the administrative region of Marienwerder that existed from 1818 to 1920. It belonged to the province of West Prussia until 1829 and then again from 1878 to 1920. Between 1829 and 1878, it belonged to the Province of Prussia. It was located in the part of West Prussia that fell to Poland after the World War I in 1920 through the Treaty of Versailles. The city of Graudenz, was part of the district until 1900, after which it formed its own independent urban district.

From 1939 to 1945, the district was re-established in occupied Poland as part of the newly established Reichsgau Danzig-West Prussia. Today this area lies in the Polish Kuyavian-Pomeranian Voivodeship.

History 
The area of the future Graudenz district became part of Prussia through the First Partition of Poland in 1772. As part of the historical Kulmerland, it belonged to the Kulm district from 1772. In the course of the Prussian administrative reforms, on April 30, 1815 the area became part of the Marienwerder administrative region in West Prussia. As part of a comprehensive district reform, the northern part of the Kulm district split off to become the new Graudenz district (German: Kreis Graudenz) on April 1, 1818. This included the urban centers of Graudenz, Lessen and Rehden. The seat of the district administration was the city of Graudenz. From December 3, 1829 to April 1, 1878, West Prussia and East Prussia were united to form the Province of Prussia, which belonged to the German Reich since January 1871.

On October 1, 1887, the Graudenz district ceded part of its territory to the new district of Briesen. Since January 1, 1900, the city of Graudenz has formed its own urban district known as Stadtkreis Graudenz. The remainder of the Graudenz district came to be known as Landkreis Graudenz. After World War I, the city and the district of Graudenz had to be ceded to Poland on January 10, 1920 due to the provisions of the Versailles Treaty.

After the invasion of Poland in 1939, the district was annexed by Germany in violation of international law and on November 26, 1939, the district under its German name became part of the newly formed Reichsgau West Prussia, soon renamed Reichsgau Danzig-West Prussia in the new administrative region of Marienwerder. In the spring of 1945, the district was occupied by the Red Army and was restored to Poland. In the following years, the remaining German population was largely expelled.

Demographics 
The district had a German majority population with a large Polish minority.

Politics

District administrators 

 1838–1850: Friedrich Brauns
 1850–1877: Ludwig Constantin Tichy
 1877–1878: Friedrich Wilhelm Carl von Brauchitsch
 1878–1909: Adalbert von Conrad
 1909–1920: Hans Kutter

Elections 
In the German Empire, the Marienwerder 3 Reichstag constituency was made up of the Graudenz and Strasburg districts. Due to the ethnic composition of the electorate, the constituency was contested between German and Polish candidates in all Reichstag elections. As a rule, there was a runoff between the national liberal and the Polish candidate. 
 1871:Julius von Hennig, National Liberal Party
 1874:Hugo Bieler, National Liberal Party
 1877:Hugo Bieler, National Liberal Party
 1878:Hugo Bieler, National Liberal Party
 1881:Ignacy von Lyskowski, Polish Party
 1884:Ignacy von Lyskowski, Polish Party
 1887:Arthur Hobrecht, National Liberal Party
 1890:Wladyslaw Rozycki, Polish Party
 1893:Wladyslaw Rozycki, Polish Party
 1898:Julius Sieg, National Liberal Party
 1903:Julius Sieg, National Liberal Party
 1907:Julius Sieg, National Liberal Party
 1912:Julius Sieg, National Liberal Party

Municipalities 
In 1910, the district of Graudenz included the two towns of Lessen and Rehden and 80 rural communities.

References 

States and territories disestablished in 1920
States and territories established in 1818
Grudziądz County
Graudenz